John W. Bond  (born 1956) is an English physicist. He developed a technique for lifting fingerprints off of metal years after they are left by virtue of the corrosion caused to the metal by the fingerprint sweat. He has several patented inventions related to metal corrosion. His invention was named a Times magazine best invention of 2008.  In 2011 he received an OBE in the Queen's Birthday Honours list for services to Forensic Science.

References

External links
University of Leicester / Dr. John Bond Website has extensive career biography.
Museumstuff / John Bond physicist Website has links to topics related to John Bond.
Scientist Interviews An interview with John Bond about the fingerprint retrieval process he developed. (June 2008)

English physicists
1956 births
Living people
20th-century British physicists
21st-century British physicists
21st-century British inventors
Officers of the Order of the British Empire